William Banach (1903–1951) was a member of the Wisconsin State Assembly.

Biography
Banach was born William Philip Banach on March 30, 1903 in Milwaukee, Wisconsin. He went to South Division High School. He was Roman Catholic and was a member of the Knights of Columbus. Banach was a draftsman, insurance agent, and owned a tavern. He served on the Milwaukee Common Council. Banach died on March 24, 1951.

Career
Banach was a member of the Assembly from 1947 to 1951. He was a Democrat.

References

Politicians from Milwaukee
Businesspeople from Milwaukee
Wisconsin city council members
1903 births
1951 deaths
20th-century American businesspeople
20th-century American politicians
Democratic Party members of the Wisconsin State Assembly